Sarojini Naidu (13 February 1879 – 2 March 1949) was an Hyderabad, Indian political activist and poet. A proponent of civil rights, women's emancipation, and anti-imperialistic ideas, she was an important figure in Indian independence movement. Naidu's work as a poet earned her the sobriquet 'the Nightingale of India' by Mahatma Gandhi because of colour, imagery, and lyrical quality of her poetry.

Naidu was proficient in Urdu, Telugu, English, Bengali, and Persian. Her command of poetry had brought her international acclamation, Naidu's literary contribution, particularly for her poems with the themes like patriotism, romanticism and lyric for which she is called "Nightingale of India"—(Bharat Kokila) by Mahatma Gandhi. Her birthday is celebrated in India as National women's day.

Work

Plays
Meher Muneer-(Persian) 1885

Essays
Words of Freedom - Ideas of a Nation.

Books (English)

1905: The Golden Threshold, London: William Heineman

1912: The Bird of Time: Songs of Life, Death & the Spring, London: William Heineman and New York: John Lane Company

1917: The Broken Wing: Songs of Love, Death and the Spring, London: William Heinemann

1917: The Song of the Palanquin Bearers, lyrics by Naidu and music by Martin Shaw, London: Curwen

1918: The Speeches and Writings of Sarojini Naidu, Madras: G.A. Natesan and Company

1919: Mohammed Ali Jinnah: An Ambassador of Unity His Speeches and Writings 1912-1917, Madras: Ganesh and Company.

1928: The Sceptred Flute: Songs of India, New York: Dodd, Mead, and Company.

1961: The Feather of the Dawn'', authored by Naidu in 1927, edited by Padmaja Naidu, Bombay: Asia Publishing House.

Other works
​Speeches and Writings of Sarojini Naidu.

The Lady of the Lake (1300 lines poem) written in her childhood.

The Indian Weavers, (1971) is a short poem published posthumously.

Further reading
The Broken Wing: Songs of Love, Death and Destiny (1915-16)
Sarojini Naidu: Her Way With Words, Niyogi Books, 2006 by Mushirul Hasan.

References 

Works by Sarojini Naidu
Sarojini Naidu